Toni Spiss (8 April 1930 – 20 March 1993) was an Austrian alpine skier.

He was born and died in Sankt Anton am Arlberg.

At the 1952 Olympics in Oslo Spiss was bronze medalist in the giant slalom, 3.8 seconds behind gold winner Stein Eriksen.

References

External links

1930 births
1993 deaths
Austrian male alpine skiers
Olympic alpine skiers of Austria
Alpine skiers at the 1952 Winter Olympics
Olympic bronze medalists for Austria
Olympic medalists in alpine skiing
Medalists at the 1952 Winter Olympics
20th-century Austrian people